Shilpa Maskey (born April 14, 1992 in Biratnagar, Nepal) is a Nepalese film actress, model and dancer. She debuted in the Nepali film industry as a lead from the movie The Break Up opposite Aashirman DS Joshi. Her second Nepali movie was Kagaz Patra opposite Najir Hussain. She has done many music videos, films, photoshoots and advertisements both internationally and nationally. She has done minor appearances in Hollywood projects like  Doctor Strange and Mission: Impossible – Fallout, and Netflix series The Crown, Season 2, episode 5 and short movie Shooting an Elephant and Bollywood movie Gold. Her third nepali movie was Sano Mann alongside Ayushman Joshi and her next venture, Kathaputali is yet to release.

Filmography

References

External links 
 

Living people
Nepalese female models
Nepalese women
1992 births
People from Biratnagar
Nepalese film actresses
Actresses in Nepali cinema
21st-century Nepalese actresses